Barnes City, Iowa
 Barnes City, California (1920–1927), the early 20th century winter home of Al G. Barnes Circus incorporated and zoned for approximately seven months in 1927.

References